"Lampara Pa`Mis Pies" is a song by Juan Luis Guerra, released on August 30, 2019 as the fourth single from his fourteenth studio album Literal. The music video was recorded in Puerto Plata, Dominican Republic.

Charts

References 

2019 singles
Juan Luis Guerra songs
2019 songs
Songs written by Juan Luis Guerra